Rugby Livorno 1931 is an Italian rugby union team from Livorno.
The club was founded in 1931 (hence that year in the club's name) and spent several seasons in the Italy's top tier championship.

Rugby Livorno 1931's best placement in the Italian Premiership was 6th place in 1989/90 and they played overall 17 seasons in the main division.
Currently the team plays in Serie B, the third division of Italian rugby union.

Notable former players
 Stefano Bettarello
 Michael Cheika
 Andrea De Rossi
 Fabio Gaetaniello
 Gianluca Guidi
 Marzio Innocenti
 David Knox
 Andrea Lovotti
 Matteo Mazzantini
 Stefano Saviozzi

External links
Rugby Livorno 1931 Official Site

Italian rugby union teams